

Major bridges

References 
 Nicolas Janberg, Structurae.com, International Database for Civil and Structural Engineering

 Others references

See also 

 Transport in Sudan
 Rail transport in Sudan

Sudan

b
Bridges